The canton of Saint-Haon-le-Châtel is a French former administrative division located in the department of Loire and the Rhône-Alpes region. It was disbanded following the French canton reorganisation which came into effect in March 2015. It consisted of 12 communes, which joined the new canton of Renaison in 2015. It had 13,032 inhabitants (2012).

The canton comprised the following communes:

Ambierle
Arcon
Noailly
Les Noës
Renaison
Saint-Alban-les-Eaux
Saint-André-d'Apchon
Saint-Germain-Lespinasse
Saint-Haon-le-Châtel
Saint-Haon-le-Vieux
Saint-Rirand
Saint-Romain-la-Motte

See also
Cantons of the Loire department

References

Former cantons of Loire (department)
2015 disestablishments in France
States and territories disestablished in 2015